Katharina Ramsauer (born 21 May 1995) is an Austrian freestyle skier. She competed in the 2022 Winter Olympics.

Career
Ramsauer began skiing in 2011. She won two bronze medals at the 2017 Winter Universiade. She finished 24th out of 30 competitors in the first qualifying round in the women's moguls event at the 2022 Winter Olympics before finishing 19th in the second qualifying round, failing to qualify for the finals.

Personal life
Ramsauer attended HTL Braunau, where she received a Master's degree in sports and movement sciences and a Bachelor's degree in sports science.

References

1995 births
Living people
Freestyle skiers at the 2022 Winter Olympics
Austrian female freestyle skiers
Olympic freestyle skiers of Austria
People from Hallein
Universiade medalists in freestyle skiing
Universiade bronze medalists for Austria
Competitors at the 2015 Winter Universiade
Competitors at the 2017 Winter Universiade
Sportspeople from Salzburg (state)